Győri ETO KC (lit. Concordance Gymnastics Department of Győr Handball Club) is a Hungarian women's handball club from Győr. Since they are sponsored by Audi, the official name for the team is Győri Audi ETO KC.

On domestic level ETO won 16 Hungarian Championship title, including seven in a row between 2008 and 2014. They are also a fifteen-time Hungarian Cup winners, having won all their finals between 2005 and 2016.

ETO won the Champions League in 2013, 2014, 2017, 2018, and 2019.  The team also reached the final in 2009, 2012, 2016, and in 2022. In addition, Győr reached the final of the EHF Cup Winners' Cup in 2006 and the final of the EHF Cup in 1999, 2002, 2004, and 2005.

History
The first golden era
The ETO was founded in 1904, but the women's handball section wasn't created until 1948. The first edition of the Hungarian Championship was held in 1951.

President János Lang and department leader Vilmos Joósz started to build the first "golden team" in the mid-fifties. The members of the first team that succeeded were Magdolna Matulay, Ilona Dittrich, Magdolna Novák, Ilona Szalai, and Éva Boudny. At the beginning, the coach of the team was Pál Kellner, but he emigrated to Sweden after the 1956 revolution, so the team was in a need for a new coach. Károly Varga took over the responsibility, but after the summer break, he was replaced by László Stéger.

In 1957, ETO won their first Hungarian Championship title  - in their first season playing in the top level championship - after a victory in the final round against Goldberger. Multiple players missed the 1958 Championship due to pregnancy, therefore the team finished at the disappointing 8th position. The new year however brought success again, thanks to signing one of the greatest players of the era, Magda Jóna. ETO won the 1959 Championship, while Magda Jóna became the topscorer with 225 goals scored. The successful performance continued, in 1960 they finished second behind Bp. Spartacus.

Towards the end

After Magda Jóna left the team in 1960, the success seemed to avoid the club as well. Between 1961 and 1965, ETO reached only a 4th and an 11th position, while László Stéger left the bench. His replacement was Jenő Kheim. In 1966, ETO finished 13th and got relegated from the Nemzeti Bajnokság I. They gained promotion to the first league once more for a season, but could not make their good run last long, since they got relegated even from the third division. The club of ETO decided to terminate the handball department.

More than a decade without ETO

Between 1980 and 1992, the handball team in Győr went through several struggles. They either played in the lower championships or were considered as a "middle team" in the first league. There were several names changes in the club's life, including Győri Vasas or Győri Richards. In 1992, Győri ETO Kézilabda Club was established, which was owned by the Municipality of Győr. The president was Attila Vanyus (between 1992 and 2012), who built up the successful club we know today with his persistent, hard work.

ETO again

From 1993, a really strong team was formed in Győr. Players like Mariann Horváth, Beáta Hoffmann, Anikó Nagy, Gabriella Szabados, Eszter Mátéfi, and Anna Szántó were playing for ETO. They reached the 5th position, while Eszter Mátéfi became the top scorer of the Nemzeti Bajnokság I.
Kálmán Róth took over the team from 1994. With his lead, the team played their first ever European Cup match in the City Cup against the Swiss team, ZMC Zürich. Katalin Pálinger, Krisztina Pigniczki or Anita Kulcsár were the key players of their club and the national team as well.

ETO played in the EHF Cup for the first time in the 1998/99 season. They reached the final, but fell short against the more powerful Danish side, Viborg HK.

First season in the Champions League, another success on European level

ETO played in the Champions League in the 2000/01 season for the first time. They could not go through from the group phase, on the other hand they finished on the 3rd position in the Nemzeti Bajnokság I. Important players left the team, so the staff decided to fill up the empty gaps with players from their own youth team. Players like: Anita Görbicz, Ibolya Mehlmann, Viktória Petróczi, and Gabriella Kindl.

In 2002, ETO played the final of the EHF Cup against Ikast, then the semifinal of Cup Winners' Cup in 2003 against ESBF Besançon and the 2004 EHF Cup final against Viborg HK, while more young players joined the squad, like Bernadett Bódi, Orsolya Herr, Renáta Mörtel, Bernadett Temes or Gabriella Juhász.

In 2005, ETO strengthened their squad with Romanian internationals; Aurelia Brădeanu and Simona Gogîrlă. In the Hungarian Championship, ETO was able to win the title after an exciting fight against Dunaferr, which meant that the gold medal returned to Győr after 46 years.

2005 - 2012 Dominance in Hungary

Since 2005, the club is sponsored by Audi, therefore the official name for the team is Győri Audi ETO KC. With the help of their new sponsor, they won 6 Hungarian Championship titles and 7 Hungarian Cup during seven seasons.

In the European Cups, they reached the final of EHF Cup in 2005, where they fell short against Hungarian rivals, Alcoa FKC, then the final of EHF Cup Winners' Cup in 2006, where they lost against ŽRK Budućnost Podgorica.

In 2009, Győri ETO reached the final of the Champions League, meeting Danish champion Viborg HK. Due to a knee injury suffered days before the first leg, captain Anita Görbicz couldn't take part in the finals. Győr won the first match away 26–24 but was defeated at Veszprém Aréna 23–26, thus losing the title on aggregate score.
In 2012, the team made it to the EHF Champions League finals again, where they fell short to ŽRK Budućnost Podgorica on the away goals rule. ETO won the first leg on home soil to 29–27, while their Montenegrin opponent achieved a 27–25 victory in the rematch which was just enough for them to gain the title.

During the years, both Hungarian and foreign handball talents and stars wore the green and white jersey, such as Anikó Kovacsics, Zsuzsanna Tomori, Eduarda Amorim, Katrine Lunde, Heidi Løke, Ana Gros, Andrea Lekić or Jovanka Radičević.

2012–2021 Reaching the Top
For the 2012/13 season, coach Ambros Martín joined the squad and have worked with the team for six years. ETO reached the final of the Champions League and could finally win after 7 lost European cup finals. They were able to win a thrilling semifinal rematch against Oltchim Vâlcea, where the guest Romanian team were leading in the 51st minute even with 6 goals. The last 10 minutes of the match were incredible from Győr's point of view, because they were able to come back to the match and lose with only 1 goal. Considering, that they have won their first match in Romania with 2 goals, that loss meant that they have made it to the final, where they had to face the Norwegian powerhouse Larvik HK. After a victory in Norway (24–21), they won the rematch and the title at the same time in the Veszprém Aréna.
Since 2014 the winner of the Champions League have been decided in a Final Four tournament. ETO defended their title, which meant they won the last title in the old format and the first in the new one.

In the Ambros Martín era (2012–2018) ETO won 4 Champions League titles (in 2013 against Larvik, in 2014 against Budućnost, in 2017 against HC Vardar and in 2018 once again against HC Vardar) and lost one final (in 2016 against CSM București). In Hungary, their dominance remained, they won 5 Hungarian Championship titles and 5 Hungarian Cups, as well as 2 Hungarian Supercups. They lost only two titles, both against Ferencváros.

In February 2018, the club announced that the most successful coach of the club's history, Ambros Martín won't extend his contract and will leave the team after the 2017–18 season. Gábor Danyi - who was the assistant coach of the team since 2011 - took over his place on the bench. Danyi's first season as the head coach was ETO's best season so far. They did not just win all the titles possible, but remained unbeaten throughout the whole season. However, in May 2021 Danyi got sacked after a huge (9 goals) defeat against the domestic rivals Ferencváros, which also meant the team lost the National Championship title for the first time after 2015. The team lost 2 matches in total during Danyi's three-year tenure. Ambros Martín returned to the bench.

In the Danyi era (2018–2021) ETO won 1 Hungarian Championship title, 2 Hungarian Cups and 1 Champions League final as well as finishing 3rd once in the most prestigious European competition. The COVID-19 pandemic also happened to appear during this period.

2021–present, 70 unbeaten matches, 200th Champions League win

On 4 June 2021 the legend and icon of Győri ETO KC, Anita Görbicz played her last match for the team and retired after spending 24 seasons playing for the club. Another important and outstanding player of the era, Eduarda Amorim also played her last match for the team that day, leaving the club after 12 seasons. The club holds the record for the longest unbeaten run in the EHF Champions League. Between 5 February 2018 and 6 February 2022 all their matches ended with either a victory or a draw. They set the record for 70 unbeaten matches in a row. In March 2022 it was announced that Csaba Bartha, the president of the club got his contract terminated on mutual consent. On 24 September 2022 ETO lost a Champions League group match to French side Metz in the Audi Aréna after almost 7 years since the last loss on home court.

Beating HC Lokomotiva Zagreb 26:17 in round 11 (on 14 January 2023) of the competition marked Györ's record-setting 200th win in Champions League, becoming the first women's team to reach the respective milestone.

Crest, colours, supporters

Kit manufacturers and Shirt sponsor
The following table shows in detail Győri ETO KC kit manufacturers and shirt sponsors by year:

Kits

Arena
Name: Audi Aréna 
City: Győr, Hungary
Capacity: 5,500 spectators
Address: H-9027 Győr, Kiskút liget 4,

Team

Current squad
Squad for the 2022–23 season

Goalkeepers
 12  Amandine Leynaud
 16  Silje Solberg (pregnant)
 19  Alexa Győri
 89  Sandra Toft
Left wingers
 6  Nadine Schatzl
 23  Csenge Fodor
Right wingers
 22  Viktória Győri-Lukács
 48  Dorottya Faluvégi 
Pivots
 5  Linn Blohm
 7  Kari Brattset Dale
 31  Yvette Broch

Left backs
 2  Line Haugsted
 4  Eszter Ogonovszky
 8  Anne Mette Hansen (c)
 21  Veronica Kristiansen (pregnant)
 45  Noémi Háfra 
Centre backs
 15  Stine Bredal Oftedal
 27  Estelle Nze Minko
 81  Júlia Farkas
Right backs
 9  Ana Gros 
 11  Ryu Eun-hee
 80  Jelena Despotović

Transfers

Transfers for the 2023–24 season

 Joining
  Ulrik Kirkely (head coach) (from  Odense Håndbold)
  Bruna de Paula (CB) (from  Metz Handball)
  Emilie Hovden (RW) (from  Viborg HK)

 Leaving
  Ambros Martín (head coach)
  Raphaëlle Tervel (assistant coach) ?
  Amandine Leynaud (GK) (retires)
  Anne Mette Hansen (LB) (to  Metz Handball)
  Jelena Despotović (RB) ?
  Dorottya Faluvégi (RW) (to  SG BBM Bietigheim)
  Noémi Háfra (LB) (on loan to  ŽRK Budućnost Podgorica)

Retired numbers

Staff members
  Chairman: Anita Görbicz
  International Relations: Tamás Szabó
  Technical Director: Péter Molnár
  Head Coach: Ambros Martín
  Assistant Coach: Raphaëlle Tervel
  Goalkeeping Coach: Éva Kiss
  Fitness Coach: Zoltán Holanek
  Club Doctor: Péter Balogh, MD
  Club Doctor: László Szálasy, MD

Notable former players

  Anita Görbicz (1997–2021)
  Beáta Hoffmann (–1985, 1992–2001)
  Anita Kulcsár (1995–2001)
  Anikó Nagy (1992–2001)
  Katalin Pálinger (–2000, 2007–2012)
  Krisztina Pigniczki (1993–2001)
  Anna Szántó (1993–1996)
  Orsolya Vérten (2002–2012)
  Magda Jóna (1958–1959)
  Ágnes Hornyák (2006–2015)
  Anikó Kovacsics (2006–2016)
  Éva Kiss (2015–2020)
  Bernadett Bódi (2001–2007, 2013–2020)
  Zsuzsanna Lovász (2000–2003)
  Mónika Kovacsicz (2003–2007)
  Orsolya Herr (2000–2009, 2012–2015)
  Gabriella Juhász (2003–2007)
  Adrienn Orbán (2004–2005, 2009–2017)
  Zsuzsanna Tomori (2007–2010, 2015–2019)
  Viktória Győri-Lukács (2020– )
  Nadine Schatzl (2010–2012, 2021– )
  Irina Sirina (2000–2006)
  Piroska Szamoránsky (–2005)
  Renáta Mörtel (1999–2006)
  Ibolya Mehlmann (1999–2005)
  Gabriella Kindl (1999–2003)
  Marianna Bordásné Horváth (1992–2001)
  Csenge Fodor (2017– )
  Rita Borbás (2003–2005)
  Bojana Radulović (2006–2007)
  Dorina Korsós (2012–2017)
  Dorottya Faluvégi (2019–2023)
  Viktória Soós (2012–2014)
  Ivett Szepesi (2012–2015)
  Dóra Hornyák (2012–2014)
  Noémi Háfra (2021– )
  Andrea Farkas (2006)
  Katrine Lunde (2010–2015)
  Heidi Løke (2011–2017)
  Kari Aalvik Grimsbø (2015–2020)
  Stine Bredal Oftedal (2017– )
  Veronica Kristiansen (2018– )
  Kari Brattset Dale (2018– )
  Silje Solberg (2020– )
  Nora Mørk (2016–2019)
  Linn Jørum Sulland (2015–2016)
  Ida Alstad (2016)
  Amanda Kurtović (2019–2020)
  Aurelia Brădeanu (2004–2011)
  Simona Gogîrlă (2004–2007)
  Crina Pintea (2018–2019, 2021–2022)
  Ana Maria Șomoi (2005–2007)
  Carmen Nitescu (2001–2004)
  Raphaëlle Tervel (2012–2014, 2022)
  Amandine Leynaud (2018–2022, 2023)
  Estelle Nze Minko (2019– )
  Béatrice Edwige (2019–2021)
  Laura Glauser (2020–2022)
  Katarina Bulatović (2013–2014, 2019–2020)
  Jovanka Radičević (2011–2013)
  Ana Đokić (2002–2008)
  Jelena Despotović (2021– )
  Anne Mette Hansen (2017–2023)
  Sandra Toft (2022– )
  Line Haugsted (2022– )
  Nycke Groot (2015–2019)
  Yvette Broch (2015–2018, 2022– )
  Jelena Grubišić (2014–2015)
  Vesna Milanović-Litre (2014–2015)    
  Anja Althaus (2017–2018)
  Susann Müller (2014–2015)
  Macarena Aguilar (2014–2015)
  Mireya González (2018)
  Eduarda Amorim (2009–2021)
  Ana Gros (2010–2012, 2022– )
  Linn Blohm (2021– )
  Andrea Lekić (2011–2013)
  Katarína Mravíková (2007–2011)
  Jana Knedlíková (2015–2020)
  Ryu Eun-hee (2021– )
  Anna Sen (2014–2015)

   Eszter Mátéfi (1993–1997)
   Gabriela Rotiș (2008–2009)
   Simona Spiridon (2007–2011)
   Asma Elghaoui (2016–2017)

Head coach history

Chairman history

Honours

Domestic competitions
Nemzeti Bajnokság I (National Championship of Hungary)
 Champions (16) – record: 1957, 1959, 2004–05, 2005–06, 2007–08, 2008–09, 2009–10, 2010–11, 2011–12, 2012–13, 2013–14, 2015–16, 2016–17, 2017–18, 2018–19, 2021–22
 Runners-up: 1960, 1997–98, 1999–00, 2003–04, 2006–07, 2014–15, 2020–21
 Third place: 1998–99, 2000–01, 2001–02, 2002–03

Magyar Kupa (National Cup of Hungary)
 Winners (15) – record: 2004–05, 2005–06, 2006–07, 2007–08, 2008–09, 2009–10, 2010–11, 2011–12, 2012–13, 2013–14, 2014–15, 2015–16, 2017–2018, 2018–2019, 2020–2021
 Finalists: 1999–00, 2001–02, 2003–04, 2016–17, 2021–22

Szuperkupa (Super Cup of Hungary); Championship vs. Cup winner
 Winners: 2014 (Ch.), 2015 (C.)

European competitions
 EHF Champions League:
 Winners: 2013, 2014, 2017, 2018, 2019
 Finalists: 2009, 2012, 2016, 2022
 Third place: 2007, 2008, 2010, 2021
 EHF Cup Winners' Cup:
 Finalists: 2006
 EHF Cup:
 Finalists: 1999, 2002, 2004, 2005

Others
 Hungarian Sport Team Of The Year: 2014, 2017, 2018

Recent seasons

Seasons in Nemzeti Bajnokság I: 43
Seasons in Nemzeti Bajnokság I/B: 9
Seasons in Nemzeti Bajnokság II: 2

In European competition

Source: kézitörténelem.hu
Participations in Champions League: 20×
Participations in EHF European League (EHF Cup): 4×
Participations in Challenge Cup (City Cup): 2×
Participations in Cup Winners' Cup: 3×

Statistics: matches played – 329, wins – 239, draws – 22, losses – 68, goals scored – 9,563, goals conceded – 8,040, goal difference – +1,523

Statistics

Individual awards in the EHF Champions League

Top scorers in the EHF Champions League 
(All-Time) – Last updated on 11 February 2023
Every player that has scored at least 100 goals is included.

Top scorers in the EHF Champions League FINAL4 
(All-Time) – Last updated on 6 June 2022

Most league appearances
Last updated on 31 December 2022

Top league goalscorers
Last updated on 31 December 2022

Champions League winners

See also
Győri ETO FC
Győri ETO Futsal Club

References

External links
Győri ETO KC official website
 
2019–20 Győri ETO KC season
2020–21 Győri ETO KC season
2021–22 Győri ETO KC season
2022–23 Győri ETO KC season

 
Sport in Győr
Handball clubs established in 1948